Fuelin' Around is a 1949 short subject directed by Edward Bernds starring American slapstick comedy team The Three Stooges (Moe Howard, Larry Fine and Shemp Howard). It is the 116th entry in the series released by Columbia Pictures starring the comedians, who released 190 shorts for the studio between 1934 and 1959.

Plot
The Stooges are carpet layers working at the home of their friend, Professor Sneed (Emil Sitka) and his daughter, Hazel Sneed (Christine McIntyre). Sneed is developing a rocket fuel in secret for the government. Anemian spy Captain Rork (Philip Van Zandt) from a fictional European country of Anemia watches the professor through his front window, with hopes of kidnapping him. The Anemians accidentally capture the Stooges instead, mistaking Larry for the professor. Trouble brews when the Stooges are required to quickly create some of the fuel, and then write down the formula. It does not take long for the Anemians to capture the real Professor Sneed, along with his daughter, and throw them in jail until the formula is disclosed. Thanks to a shy prison guard (Jacques O'Mahoney) who cannot help but flirt with Sneed's daughter, the group make a quick exit by successfully getting out of the fortress immediately by using the fuel into the fuel tank and blasted out of the fortress, out of Anemia and back to America.

Cast
Moe Howard as Moe
Larry Fine as Larry
Shemp Howard as Shemp
Emil Sitka as Professor Snead
Christine McIntyre as Hazel Snead
Phil Van Zandt as Capt. Rork
Vernon Dent as Anemian General 
Andre Pola as Anemian Colonel
Jock Mahoney as Cell Guard
Harold Brauer as Leon (uncredited)
Blackie Whiteford as Anemian soldier (uncredited)
Jimmy Aubrey as Anemian soldier (uncredited)

Production notes
Fuelin' Around was filmed on April 6–9, 1948. It was remade in 1956 as Hot Stuff using available stock footage. The film title is a pun on the expression "fooling around."

References

External links
 
 

1949 films
The Three Stooges films
American black-and-white films
Films set in Europe
Films directed by Jules White
1949 comedy films
Columbia Pictures short films
American comedy films
1940s English-language films
1940s American films